Nattesferd is the third studio album by Norwegian heavy metal band Kvelertak, released on 13 May 2016. The album was recorded in Oslo. It is the band's last album with vocalist Erlend Hjelvik and drummer Kjetil Gjermundrød.

Background
Kvelertak released the first song "1985" on 8 March 2016. Nattesferd is the band's first album recorded in Norway. The band released music videos for the songs "1985", "Nattesferd" and "Svartmesse".

Accolades

Track listing

Personnel
Kvelertak
 Erlend Hjelvik – vocals
 Vidar Landa – guitar
 Bjarte Lund Rolland – guitar, piano
 Maciek Ofstad – guitar, vocals
 Marvin Nygaard – bass
 Kjetil Gjermundrød – drums

Production
 Nick Terry – mixing, engineering

Charts

References 

 

2016 albums
Kvelertak albums
Norwegian-language albums
Roadrunner Records albums